London, Midland and Scottish Railway (LMS) Jubilee Class No. 5690 (BR No. 45690) Leander is a preserved British steam locomotive.

Operational history 
5690 was built at Crewe in March 1936 and named Leander after HMS Leander, which in turn was named after the Greek hero Leander. From March 1936 it was based at Crewe North shed where it remained until 1947 when it was transferred to the former LMS engine shed at Bristol (Barrow Road). After nationalisation in 1948, it was renumbered 45690 by British Railways.

After being withdrawn in 1964, Leander was sold to Woodham Brothers scrapyard in Barry, South Wales.

Preservation

Rescued by Brian Oliver in May 1972, it was restored by the Leander Locomotive Society at Derby and later kept at the Dinting Railway Museum, Glossop. After later purchase by and running on the Severn Valley Railway, Leander was sold to Dr Peter Beet, and restored to running condition on the East Lancashire Railway in LMS Crimson Lake livery. As of 2008, Leander was owned by Chris Beet (Engineering and Rail Operations Manager, National Railway Museum) and operated by the West Coast Railway Company from their Carnforth MPD base.

In 2008, Leander provided motive power for the Scarborough Spa Express heritage service. It also spent October at the Great Central Railway "Steam Railway" gala, alongside Britannia Class No. 70013 Oliver Cromwell and LNER Peppercorn Class A1 No. 60163 Tornado.

In September 2010, Leander visited the Severn Valley Railway (SVR) for their 40th anniversary Autumn steam gala alongside fellow visiting locomotives and former Severn Valley based engines 2251 Class No. 3205, No. 3717 City of Truro, 4575 Class No. 5542 and West Country Class No. 34070 Manston. Leander departed from the SVR at the beginning of October hauling the Severn Valley Limited to Blackpool North one way only as the locomotive was en route to the East Lancashire Railway for a few weeks stay during their Autumn Steam Gala. Shortly afterwards, Leander returned to Carnforth and mainline operation.

In April 2012, Leander was withdrawn early for overhaul due to its poor condition. Chris Beet managed the overhaul, assisted by the team at West Coast Railway Company from their Carnforth MPD base. It returned to operation in October 2014, painted in BR Lined Black, the livery that it carried between 12 April 1949 and 15 November 1952, and which was also carried by 46 other members of the class from August 1948. Its first revenue earning run was to be over Shap Summit to Carlisle and back along the Settle–Carlisle line on 24 January, but it failed its FTR exam so its first revenue earning run was over Shap Summit to Carlisle, Newcastle upon Tyne, York, Manchester and Preston on 7 March 2015.

In July 2022, Leander suffered a failed super heater element while working The Waverley railtour on 10 Jul 2022. The engine was failed in Carlisle and dragged back to Hellifield behind a British Rail Class 47 no 47804 before being taken back to Carnforth MPD. As of November 2022 the engine is still undergoing repairs following its failure.

Fame in Preservation

To mark the re-opening of the Conwy Valley line in August 2019 following a closure period after suffering from multiple washouts inflicted from Storm Gareth, on 3 August 2019 Leander double headed the Conwy Quest railtour from Chester to Blaenau Ffestiniog via Llandudno Junction while double heading with 48151. It was also covering for the unavailable LMS Royal Scot No. 46115 Scots Guardsman which had been failed days before with a hot axlebox during a test run. With the route's gradient being 1 in 45 heading towards Blaenau Ffestiniog, no members of the class ran along the branch in LMS & BR days and until Aug 2019 none had been down the branch in preservation. 45690 was therefore the first member of the class to run along the Conwy Valley Line and visit Blaenau Ffestiniog. The journey from Chester to Llandudno Junction & from Blaenau Ffestiniog to Llandudno Junction was done with the engines running tender first with the other legs being with the engines running chimney first.

References

External links 	

 Jubilees detail
 Railuk database

5690
Preserved London, Midland and Scottish Railway steam locomotives
Locomotives saved from Woodham Brothers scrapyard
Standard gauge steam locomotives of Great Britain